New Zealand competed at the 1920 Summer Olympics in Antwerp, Belgium. It was the first time that the nation had competed independently at the Olympic Games (even though the International Olympic Committee had a New Zealand member — Leonard Cuff — at its establishment). At the 1908 and 1912 Summer Olympics, New Zealand had competed with Australia in a combined team called Australasia.

The New Zealand team consisted of four competitors including the first woman to represent New Zealand at the Olympic Games, Violet Walrond who was only aged 15 at the time. The team can be considered one of the most successful ever as all team members finished fifth or better in at least one of their events. The opening flagbearer was hurdler Harry Wilson. Walrond's father Cecil, generally known as Tui Walrond, was both her chaperone and also the unofficial trainer for the New Zealand team.

Medallists

Athletics

Two athletes represented New Zealand in the nation's independent Olympic debut in 1920. The two men advanced to the final in two of their three events, placing fourth and fifth.

Rowing

A single rower represented New Zealand in 1920. It was the nation's debut in the sport. Hadfield was defeated in the semifinals of the single sculls, but took the bronze medal as the faster losing semifinalist.

Swimming

A single swimmer represented New Zealand in 1920. It was the nation's debut in the sport as well as its first independent appearance at the Olympics. Walrond was the first woman from New Zealand to compete in the Olympics.

References

 
 
 
 International Olympic Committee results database

External links
Photo of New Zealand team on ship en route to Antwerp 
Cover of 1920 Olympic Programme owned by Walrond family

Nations at the 1920 Summer Olympics
1920
Olympics